National Route 410 (N410) forms part of the Philippine highway network. It runs in southern Cavite to Batangas.

Route description

Silang to Tagaytay

N410 starts at the boundary of Silang and Dasmariñas in Cavite as the physical continuation of N419 (Aguinaldo Highway). The route then shifts slightly to the east as J.P. Rizal Street, passing through the Silang town proper before returning to Aguinaldo Highway. It then enters the city of Tagaytay, where Aguinaldo Highway ends at the Tagaytay Rotonda.

Tagaytay to Calaca

Past the Tagaytay Rotonda, N410 turns southwest to become the Tagaytay–Nasugbu Highway. It then cuts through the western part Tagaytay before going along the municipal boundaries of Alfonso, Cavite and Laurel, Batangas.

Calaca to Lemery

At the intersection past the welcome arches at the provincial boundary of Cavite and Batangas, N410 turns southeast as Diokno Highway, a secondary highway that connects the municipalities of Calaca to Lemery. The route ends at the Palico-Balayan-Batangas Road in Lemery.

Intersections

References

External links 
 Department of Public Works and Highways

Roads in Cavite
Roads in Batangas